Sotir "Til" Shkurti (born 27 August 1962) is an Albanian retired footballer, who played his entire professional career as goalie for Besa Kavajë football club.

International career
In 1982, Shkurti played in an Albania national under-18 football team comprising fellow future senior international players like Skënder Gega, Mirel Josa and Sulejman Demollari.

He made his senior debut for Albania in an October 1987 Euro Championship qualification match against Romania and earned a total of 4 caps, scoring no goals.

His final international was a September 1990 friendly match against Greece.

References

External links

1962 births
Living people
Footballers from Kavajë
Albanian footballers
Association football goalkeepers
Albania international footballers
Albania youth international footballers
Besa Kavajë players
Kategoria Superiore players